Princess Elvina Pallavicini (22 January 1914 – 29 August 2004) was an Italian noblewoman, member of the Pallavicini family, part of, and often considered the leader of, the so-called Black Nobility in Rome during the second half of the 20th century.

Early life
She was born in Genoa on 22 January 1914 as Elvina dei Medici del Vascello, daughter of Giacomo dei Marchesi Medici del Vascello (1883–1949) and his wife, née Olga Leumann (d. 1966).

Later life
During the Nazi occupation of Rome after the Armistice between Italy and Allied armed forces, Princess Pallavicini supported Italian Royalist partisans and was later awarded bronze medal of military valor for doing so.

Starting from 1977, Princess Elvina Pallavicini led a group of Black Nobility that provided support for Archbishop Marcel Lefebvre. She was also actively involved in politics, in particular, supporting the policies of the US Vice President Dick Cheney and Secretary of Defense Donald Rumsfeld.

Princess Elvina Pallavicini, sometimes called the “black queen” or the “first lady” of Roman nobility, died on 29 August 2004 at Cortina d'Ampezzo. Her funeral in the basilica of San Lorenzo in Lucina was attended by numerous representatives of Italian government as well as nobility.

Marriage and family
In 1939, she married Guglielmo Marius Hubert Marie de Pierre de Bernis de Courtavel, who in 1937 was made Prince Pallavicini. The Prince was a military pilot in the Regia Aeronautica and became Missing in action on 1 August 1940 after an air fight over the Mediterranean (he was officially declared dead by an Italian court ten years later, in 1950).

The spouses' only daughter, Maria Camilla, was born after his death. Maria Camilla married, and later divorced, the grandson of Armando Diaz della Vittoria.

References 

Elvina
Nobility from Genoa
Italian princesses
1914 births
2004 deaths